Leptosiphon pygmaeus (syn. Linanthus pygmaeus) is a species of flowering plant in the phlox family known by the common name pygmy linanthus.

Distribution
It is native across much of California, including the western Sierra Nevada, Central Valley, California Coast Ranges, Transverse Ranges, and Peninsular Ranges. It is also native to the California Channel Islands (U.S.), and Guadalupe Island off the coast of Baja California (México).

It can be found below  in open or wooded areas in hills, mountains, and valleys, and in many types of habitats including chaparral, oak woodland, grassland, and yellow pine forest.

Description
It has tiny threadlike leaves.

The bloom period is March to July.

Subspecies
Leptosiphon pygmaeus subsp. continentalis — mainland distribution in coastal ranges.
Leptosiphon pygmaeus subsp. pygmaeus — Pygmy desert-gold, endemic to coastal sage scrub on San Clemente Island (California) and Guadalupe Island (Baja California). It is a Critically endangered species.

References

External links
Calflora Database: Leptosiphon pygmaeus (Pygmy linanthus)
Jepson Manual eFlora (TJM2) treatment of Leptosiphon pygmaeus
UC CalPhotos gallery: Leptosiphon pygmaeus

pygmaeus
Flora of California
Flora of Baja California
Flora of Mexican Pacific Islands
Flora of the Sierra Nevada (United States)
Natural history of the California chaparral and woodlands
Natural history of the California Coast Ranges
Natural history of the Central Valley (California)
Natural history of the Channel Islands of California
Natural history of the Peninsular Ranges
Natural history of the San Francisco Bay Area
Natural history of the Santa Monica Mountains
Natural history of the Transverse Ranges
Flora without expected TNC conservation status